Austin Roy Kalish (February 3, 1921 – October 5, 2016) was an American producer and screenwriter.

Life and career 
Kalish was born in The Bronx, New York, the son of Helen and Milton, a salesman. He attended New York University, and later served in World War II. After World War II ended, Kalish began writing jokes for comedians.

Kalish began his career writing for The Martin and Lewis Show, with his wife, Irma. They later collaborated on producing and writing for television programs, including Too Close for Comfort, All in the Family, The Bob Newhart Show, Good Times, My Favorite Martian, Maude, I Dream of Jeannie, F Troop and Family Affair.

Personal life 
Kalish was married to Irma Kalish from 1948, They had a son, comedy writer Bruce Kalish, and a daughter Nancy Biederman, who died in 2016 of leukemia.

Death 
Kalish died in October 2016 at the Motion Picture & Television Fund cottages in Woodland Hills, California, at the age of 95.

References

External links 

Austin Kalish at Find a Grave

1921 births
2016 deaths
Television producers from New York (state)
American male screenwriters
American television writers
American male television writers
American television producers
Screenwriters from New York (state)
American comedy writers
New York University alumni
American military personnel of World War II
Burials at Mount Sinai Memorial Park Cemetery